Trick of the Light may refer to:
 "Trick of the Light" (The Triffids song), 1988
 "Trick of the Light" (The Who song), 1978
 Trick of the Light (album), by Modern Romance

See also
 "Tricks of the Light", 1984 song by Mike Oldfield
 A Trick of Light, 1995 film
 A Trick of the Light (novel), 2011 novel by Louise Penny